is a 1984 one shot Japanese horror manga by Hideshi Hino. It was published in the United States by Blast Books and in France as Panorama de l'enfer by Éditions IMHO in 2004.

Synopsis
An artist describes his work, consisting of hellish views he paints using his own blood. He then introduces the reader to his unconventional family, and tells stories about his abusive parents, who escaped from Manchuria after World War II, and his violent childhood. Eventually, his plan to paint a final masterpiece, a full-scale "Hell on Earth" unfolds.

Reception
It was nominated for Best Album at the 2005 Angoulême International Comics Festival.

References

External links

Review at cinemasie.com 
Review at Anime News Network

1984 manga
Horror anime and manga
One-shot manga